Luiz Antônio may refer to:

 Luiz Antônio (footballer, born 1970), Luiz Antônio Moraes, Brazilian football manager and former forward
 Luiz Antônio (footballer, born 1991), Luiz Antônio de Souza Soares, Brazilian football defensive midfielder

See also
 Luís Antônio, municipality São Paulo, Brazil